Lincoln Township is a township in Pocahontas County, Iowa, USA.

History
Lincoln Township was established in 1872 as Carter Township, for Henry C. Carter, a county supervisor. However, the citizens in this township were not content with the name Carter, and so in 1873 by popular vote, it was renamed Lincoln in honor of Abraham Lincoln, sixteenth President of the United States.

References

Townships in Pocahontas County, Iowa
Townships in Iowa